Yemen is located in Southwest Asia, at the southern tip of the Arabian Peninsula, between Oman and Saudi Arabia. It is situated at the entrance to the Bab-el-Mandeb Strait, which links the Red Sea to the Indian Ocean (via the Gulf of Aden) and is one of the most active and strategic shipping lanes in the world. Yemen's land boundaries total . Yemen borders Saudi Arabia to the north and Oman to the northeast. Through the Socotra island, Yemen also shares borders with the Guardafui Channel and the Somali Sea.

Topography

Yemen occupies the southern end of the Arabian Plate.

The country's mountainous interior is surrounded by narrow coastal plains to the west, south, and east and by upland desert to the north along the border with Saudi Arabia. The highland regions are interspersed with wadis, or river valleys, that are dry in the winter months (Yemen has no permanent rivers.) Most notable is the Wadi Hadhramaut in eastern Yemen, the upper portions of which contain alluvial soil and floodwaters and the lower portion of which is barren and largely uninhabited. Both the eastern plateau region and the desert in the north are hot and dry with little vegetation.

In the northeastern Empty Quarter, sands highlight the region, being the largest expanse of sand in the world. It receives little to no rain for extensive periods of time. Little vegetation grows here either. The central highlands are drier than the western highlands because of rain-shadow influences, but still receives sufficient rain in wet years for extensive cropping. Water storage allows for irrigation and the growing of wheat and barley while the western highlands are famous for sorghum, coffee, and some tropical fruits like bananas and mangos.

Elevation
Yemen is a continuously elevated country, with only the coastal plains being the lowest-lying areas. The Yemenis used the elevation of their homeland to stay isolated for thousands of years with foreign trade conducted only when the Yemenis wished to go to the coastal areas. The mountains can be separated into a western and central highland. Less rainfall can be seen in this region, but the summer months give enough to sustain crops.

Climate
Temperatures are lower in most of Yemen than in most of the Arab world due to most of the country being at high elevation. Rainfall is higher at higher elevations. The climate of the Tihamah (western coastal plain) is tropical; temperatures occasionally exceed , and the humidity ranges from 50 to 70 percent. Rainfall, which comes in irregular heavy torrents, averages  annually. The capital, Sana'a, receives around  a year, it is not uncommon for the northern and eastern sections of the country to receive no rain for five years or more. The Wadi Hadhramaut in the eastern part of Yemen is arid and hot, and the humidity ranges from 35 percent in June to 64 percent in January. Yemen has the most fertile land in the Arabian peninsula.

Coastline and maritime claims
Yemen has  of coastline along the Arabian Sea, the Gulf of Aden, and the Red Sea.

Natural resources
Yemen's principal natural resources are oil and natural gas as well as agriculturally productive land in the west. Other natural resources include fish and seafood, rock salt, marble, and major unexplored  deposits of coal, gold, lead, nickel, and copper.

Land use
Only 2.91 percent of Yemen is considered to be arable land, and less than 0.6 percent of the land is planted with permanent crops. About  of the land is irrigated. According to the United Nations, Yemen has  of forest and other wooded land, which constitutes almost 4 percent of total land area.

Environmental factors

Yemen is subject to sandstorms and dust storms, resulting in soil erosion and crop damage. The country has very limited natural freshwater and consequently inadequate supplies of potable water. Desertification (land degradation caused by aridity) and overgrazing are also problems. It is a party to international Biodiversity, Climate Change, Desertification, Endangered Species, Environmental Modification, Hazardous Wastes, Law of the Sea, and Ozone Layer Protection agreements.

Disputed territory
A long-standing dispute between Saudi Arabia and Yemen was resolved in June 2000 with the signing of the Treaty of Jeddah. This agreement provides coordinates for use in delineating the land and maritime border, including the section in the eastern desert region of Yemen that potentially contains significant amounts of oil. Friction between the two countries in recent years over security of the borders appears to have been alleviated by the establishment of joint border patrols. Following years of dispute between Yemen and Eritrea over ownership of the Hanish Islands and fishing rights in the Red Sea, in 1999 an international arbitration panel awarded sovereignty of the islands to Yemen. Relations between the two countries remain strained, however, and Yemen continues to protest Eritrean fishing in the disputed territory.

See also
 Mountains in the Arabian Peninsula
 Hadhramaut Mountains
 List of volcanoes in Yemen

References

 

bn:ইয়েমেন#ভূগোল